The Vaudoise Aréna (provisionally known as Espace Malley) is a multi-purpose indoor arena located in Prilly, a western suburb of Lausanne in Switzerland. Opened in September 2019, it was built on the site of the former, now demolished, CIG de Malley which it replaced to host the 2020 Winter Youth Olympics.

The arena serves as the home for Lausanne HC of the National League (NL).

History
The facility was built for hosting the 2020 Winter Youth Olympics and is one of two venues that was intended to host the 2020 IIHF World Championship, though at a reduced capacity of 8,500. The complex includes three ice rinks (the main ice rink, a training field and an outdoor ice rink). The plans also include a fencing center, a table tennis hall and a swimming pool with three pools and 1,000 spectator seats that is scheduled for completion in 2021. Vaudoise Aréna is the center of the new Malley Sports Centre. Provisionally named Espace Malley, the facility adopted its final name in September 2018, after a sponsorship agreement with the insurance company .

Local hockey clubs played in a temporary 6,700-seat ice rink (Malley 2.0), following the closure of Patinoire de Malley in 2017 and while construction work on the 9,600-seat Vaudoise Aréna took place. It was established as the largest temporary ice hockey arena in the world.

24 September 2019 saw its inaugural match of the 2019–20 NL season, which was between Lausanne and Genève-Servette HC. The Genevans won this Lemanic derby with a score of 5–3.

Events 
On 30 September 2019, Lausanne HC hosted the Philadelphia Flyers of the NHL for a gala match as part of the "2019 Global Series NHL Challenge". Leading 4–0 early in the second period, the Swiss team defeated the Pennsylvania franchise (4–3). The venue will host matches for the 2028 European Men's Handball Championship .

In July 2020, the Pétanque World Championships was supposed to be held at Vaudoise Aréna, but was cancelled due to the COVID-19 pandemic.

See also
 List of indoor arenas in Switzerland

References

External links

 

Buildings and structures in the canton of Vaud
Indoor ice hockey venues in Switzerland
2019 establishments in Switzerland
Indoor arenas in Switzerland
Sports venues in Lausanne
Sports venues completed in 2019
Venues of the 2020 Winter Youth Olympics
21st-century architecture in Switzerland